Voskresnik may refer to:

 Voskresnik (day), a day of volunteer unpaid work on Sunday after the October Revolution
 Voskresnik (liturgy), a Slavonic liturgical book of Eastern Christian hymns